The 1990 Supercopa de España was two-leg Spanish football matches played on 5 December and 12 December 1990. It contested by Barcelona, who were Spanish Cup winners in 1989–90, and Real Madrid, who won the 1989–90 Spanish League. Real Madrid won 5–1 on aggregate.

Match details

First leg

Second leg

See also
El Clásico

References
 List of Super Cup Finals 1990 RSSSF.com
  linguasport.com

Supercopa de Espana Final
Supercopa de España
Supercopa de España 1990
Supercopa de España 1990
Supercopa de España